Shepard Cary (July 3, 1805 – August 9, 1866) was a U.S. Representative from Maine.

Born in New Salem, Massachusetts, Cary attended the common schools and moved with his parents to Houlton, Maine, in 1822. He engaged in extensive lumber operations and also in agricultural and mercantile pursuits.
He served as member of the Maine House of Representatives in 1832, 1833 from 1839 to 1842, 1848, 1849, and 1862, and in the Maine State Senate in 1843 and from 1850 to 1853.

Cary was elected as a Democrat to the Twenty-eighth Congress. He took his seat on May 10, 1844, and served until March 3, 1845. He was the Liberty Party candidate for governor in 1854.

Cary died in Houlton, Maine on August 9, 1866, and was interred in Evergreen Cemetery.

References

1805 births
1866 deaths
People from New Salem, Massachusetts
People from Houlton, Maine
Businesspeople from Maine
Democratic Party members of the Maine House of Representatives
Democratic Party Maine state senators
Maine Libertyites
Democratic Party members of the United States House of Representatives from Maine
19th-century American politicians
19th-century American businesspeople